Media education may refer to:
Media literacy
Media studies